Philippe Labeyrie (29 April 1938 – 13 October 2012) was a French politician.

Labeyrie succeeded Charles Lamarque-Cando as mayor of Mont-de-Marsan in 1983, and served until 2008, when Geneviève Darrieussecq replaced him. He was elected to the Senate in 1983, and remained in office until 2011, when he chose not to run due to health reasons.  He was a member of the Socialist Party.

Labeyrie died on 13 October 2012, aged 74. He had been hospitalized in Mont-de-Marsan since May 2012 due to cardiac and respiratory problems.

References

1938 births
2012 deaths
French Senators of the Fifth Republic
Socialist Party (France) politicians
Senators of Landes
Mayors of places in Nouvelle-Aquitaine
21st-century French politicians
20th-century French politicians